Frank William Green (March 15, 1876 – December 24, 1953) was a Canadian physician and politician.

Green was born in Victoria, British Columbia in 1876 to Alexander Alfred Green and Theophila Turner Raines. He attended Corrig College at Victoria. After the death of his father in 1891, Green relocated to Montreal to attend McGill University where he would obtain his medical degree.
Upon his graduation from McGill in 1898, Green worked as a physician on the construction of the Canadian Pacific Railway Crowsnest Pass line, in the Kootenay Valley, working on horseback. During the time he operated a hospital and treated many during an epidemic of typhoid.

He later settled at Cranbrook, British Columbia, in the Kootenay Valley in 1899 to establish a medical practice. He was one of the first and only physicians, a medical pioneer at Cranbrook. A partnership with Dr. James Horace King of Cranbrook which started in 1903 was described as a "cornerstone in local medicine", with modern innovations being in use at the time, two examples being the first x-ray machine in the city being purchased for their hospital and the use of automobiles within the practice.

In the 1941 British Columbia general election, Green was elected as a Conservative to the Legislative Assembly of British Columbia for the district of Cranbrook. He was elected again in 1945 as a coalition member, serving until his retirement in 1949.

He married Lillian Barbara Staples of Stillwater, Minnesota in June 1905. One of his sons, William Otis Green also became a doctor in the Cranbrook area, with whom he later shared a practice with. Frank W. Green  died in 1953 of heart problems at St. Eugene Hospital in Cranbrook, which he had established. He was later cremated in Calgary. His wife Lillian died on October 22, 1965 at Cranbrook.

The F. W. Green Medical Centre and F. W. Green Memorial Home continuing care centre at Cranbrook are both named after him.

Electoral history

|Co-operative Commonwealth Fed.
|Oscar Albin Eliasin
|align="right"|1,548
|align="right"|33.89%
|align="right"|
|align="right"|unknown

|Liberal
|Arnold Joseph McGrath
|align="right"|1,405
|align="right"|30.76%
|align="right"|
|align="right"|unknown
|- bgcolor="white"
!align="right" colspan=3|Total valid votes
!align="right"|4,568
!align="right"|100.00%
!align="right"|
|- bgcolor="white"
!align="right" colspan=3|Total rejected ballots
!align="right"|52
!align="right"|
!align="right"|
|- bgcolor="white"
!align="right" colspan=3|Turnout
!align="right"|%
!align="right"|
!align="right"|
|}

|Co-operative Commonwealth Fed.
|Henry Gammon
|align="right"|1,965
|align="right"|46.40%
|align="right"|
|align="right"|unknown

|- bgcolor="white"
!align="right" colspan=3|Total valid votes
!align="right"|4,235
!align="right"|100.00%
!align="right"|
|- bgcolor="white"
!align="right" colspan=3|Total rejected ballots
!align="right"|40
!align="right"|
!align="right"|
|- bgcolor="white"
!align="right" colspan=3|Turnout
!align="right"|%
!align="right"|
!align="right"|
|}

References

1876 births
1953 deaths
British Columbia Conservative Party MLAs
Physicians from British Columbia
Politicians from Victoria, British Columbia